belit sağ (born 1980) is a videographer and visual artist from Turkey, and based in Amsterdam. She studied mathematics in Ankara and audio-visual arts in Amsterdam. She co-initiated projects like Kara Haber (2000–2007) and bak.ma. She has been a vocal opponent of censorship within Turkey through the early twenty-first century, publishing a widely read anti-censorship article in 2016.

Career
sağ completed residencies in Rijksakademie, Amsterdam in 2014–2015; and International Studio and Curatorial Program, New York in 2016. Screenings and exhibitions include: documenta, the Toronto International Film Festival, the New York Film Festival, the International Film Festival Rotterdam, among many others.

In January 2018, the artist opened her first solo exhibition, "Let Me Remember" at Squeaky Wheel Buffalo Media Arts Center. sağ's work was also included on the same year in the Flaherty NYC series "Common Visions" presented at Anthology Film Archives.

Filmography

Short films

References

External links
karahaber.org
bak.ma
Off Limits? Art, social media and censorship (panel discussion on art censorship in the age of social media, York Festival of Ideas, June 2020.)

Living people
People from Ankara
Videographers
1980 births